Nawalparasi District, part of which belongs to Gandaki Province and part to Lumbini Province, was one of the seventy-five districts of Nepal before being divided into Parasi District and Nawalpur District in 2015.

This district has given birth to many Nepal's top-level people, including the late Prime Minister Tanka Prasad Acharya. The midpoint of Nepal's east–west highway Mahendra Highway lies in this district. The Nawalpur valley is the part of greater Chitwan Valley of inner terai where most of the populations are Tharu, Magar and Brahmins who settled migrating from the hills. The big industries such as Chaudhary Udhyog Gram (CUG), Bhrikuti Pulp and Paper factory are located in the nawalpur area of this district. Since Parasi is the headquarter of Nawalparasi district many of the clerical offices are located there. Nepal's one of the biggest Sugar factory, Lumbini Sugar Industry, which was made by China's support, also lies in Sunwal Municipality of this district. Nowadays many industries are also being operated here like Sarbottam Cement factory, Butwal cement factory, Triveni distillery, cement factory of CG in Dumkibas, Jamuwad paper factory and other cottage industries. Developing cities such as Devchuli Municipality, Gaindakot Municipality, Kawasoti Municipality Sunwal Municipality, Madhyabindu Municipality and Bardaghat Municipality are located here. Famous towns in Nawalpur Ragion are Gaindakot, Rajahar, Keurani, Pragatinagar, Kawasoti, Shahid nagar Danda, Chormara, Arungkhola etc. Half of the Nawalpur Region is mainly hilly areas mainly populated by Brahmins, Magar and Chhetri people and terai area is mainly populated by Tharu people.

Nawalparasi district is connected to Rupandehi District on the west, Palpa and Tanahun Districts on the north, Chitwan District on the east and south and the Indian border. The longest road of Mahendra highway, 99 km in length, lies in this district. Major cities of Nepal such as Butwal, Siddharthanagar, Tansen and Bharatpur metropolitan municipality are located in neighbouring districts

Geography and climate
The highest peak in Nepal's Churia range, Mt. Devchuli , is in this district.

Demographics
At the time of the 2011 Nepal census, Nawalparasi District had a population of 643,508. Of these, 40.9% spoke Nepali, 29.0% Bhojpuri, 13.6% Magar, 9.8% Tharu, 1.9% Maithili, 1.5% Gurung, 1.0% Newari and 0.6% Tamang as their first language.

Village Development Committees (VDCs) and Municipalities in Nawalparasi
 

Amraut
Badahara Dubauliya
Baidauli
Banjariya
Bardaghat Municipality
Benimanipur
Bharatipur
Bhujhawa
Bulingtar
Dadajheri Tadi
Dawanne Devi
Dedgaun
Deurali
Devachuli Municipality
Devagawa
Dhobadi
Dhurkot
Dumkibas
Gaidakot Municipality 
Germi
Guthi Parsauni
Guthisuryapura
Hakui
Harpur
Hupsekot
Jahada, Lumbini
Jamuniya
Jamuwad
Jaubari
Kawasoti Municipality
Kolhuwa
Kotathar
Kudiya
Kumarwarti
Kusma
Madhyabindu Municipality
Mainaghat
Manari
Manjhariya
Mithukaram
Naram
Narsahi
Naya Belhani
Pakalihawa
Palhi
Ramgram Municipality 
Parsauni
Pratappur
Rajahar
Rakachuli
Rakuwa
Ramgram Municipality
Ramnagar
Rampur Khadauna
Rampurwa
Ratnapur
Ruchang
Rupauliya
Saidnagar Danda
Sanai
Sarawal
Somani
Sukrauli
Sunwal Municipality
Suryapura
Swathi
Tamasariya
Thulo Khairatawa
Tilakpur
Tribenisusta
Unwach
Upallo Arkhale

See also
 People's Progressive Party

References

 

 
Lumbini Zone
Gandaki Province
Lumbini Province
Districts of Nepal established in 1962
Former districts of Nepal